The Büttner Crazy Plane is a family of German paramotors designed by Gerald Büttner and produced by Büttner Propeller of Obernkirchen for powered paragliding. The aircraft are supplied complete and ready-to-fly.

Design and development
The Crazy Plane line was designed to comply with the US FAR 103 Ultralight Vehicles rules as well as European regulations. It features a paraglider-style wing, single-place or two-place-in-tandem accommodation and a single engine in pusher configuration with a reduction drive and a  diameter Büttner Propeller designed  propeller.

As is the case with all paramotors, take-off and landing is accomplished by foot. Inflight steering is accomplished via handles that actuate the canopy brakes, creating roll and yaw.

Variants
Crazy Plane 1
Model with a  Solo engine in pusher configuration with a 2.85:1 ratio reduction drive and a  diameter propeller. Later called the Crazy Plane 1 S (for "Solo" engine).
Crazy Plane 1 C
Model with a  Solo engine in pusher configuration with a 2.85:1 ratio reduction drive and a  diameter propeller. Later called the Crazy Plane 1S (for "Solo" engine).
Crazy Plane 2
Model with a  Solo engine in pusher configuration with a 3.05 ratio reduction drive and a  diameter propeller. Later called the Crazy Plane 2 S (for "Solo" engine).
Crazy Plane 3
Model with a  Solo engine in pusher configuration with a 3.25 ratio reduction drive and a  diameter propeller. Later called the Crazy Plane 3 S (for "Solo" engine).
Crazy Plane 3 H
Model with a  Hirth F33 engine.
Crazy Plane 4
Model with a  Solo engine in pusher configuration with a 3.25 ratio reduction drive and a  diameter propeller.
Crazy Plane Duo
Two place model with a  Hirth F33 engine in pusher configuration with a 2.8:1 ratio reduction drive and a  diameter propeller.
Crazy Plane Voyager 2 S
Model with a  Solo engine that folds to a smaller packing size.
Crazy Plane Voyager 3 C
Model with a Cors'Air M21Y  engine that folds to a smaller packing size.
Crazy Plane Voyager 3 H
Model with a  Hirth F33 engine that folds to a smaller packing size.
Crazy Plane Voyager 3 S
Model with a  Solo engine that folds to a smaller packing size.

Specifications (Crazy Plane Duo)

References

External links

Crazy Plane
2000s German ultralight aircraft
Single-engined pusher aircraft
Paramotors